Xidian University is a public research university in Xi'an, Shaanxi, China, that is administered by the Ministry of Education of China. Xidian focuses on electronics and information education and research, and has programs covering engineering, computer science, management, economics, liberal arts and social sciences. In 2020, U.S. News & World Report ranked Xidian 8th nationally and 22nd globally for computer science. Xidian is a Chinese state Double First Class University Plan university. It was also funded by Project 211.

Academics  
Xidian University is one of China's National Key Universities managed by the Ministry of Education of the People's Republic of China. Xidian University is organized into 17 schools. The university has undergraduate programs covering engineering, science, management and economics. It also offers Master's and PhD degrees. The university has over 31,000 students, including 21,650 undergraduate students, 9,293 master's students, and 1,779 doctoral students. 7 National Key Disciplines have been affiliated with Xidian University.

Academic standing

Xidian is one of the universities which have "National Advantage Discipline Innovation Platform", one of the 211 Project universities, one of the Double First-rate universities, one of the 56 universities having a Graduate School, one of the 35 universities having a national demonstration School of Software. It is an essential base of IT talents training and high level scientific research innovation.

The university consists of 18 schools. There are 4 state key laboratories, 5 key laboratories of the Ministry of Education, 17 provincial key laboratories and 15 university research institutes and centers. At present, Xidian University has 7 national key disciplines, 40 doctoral programs, 77 masters programs and 50 bachelor's programs: In the fields of communication networks, signal and information processing, information security, microelectronics and mechatronics, Xidian University possesses distinctive advantages and features in cultivation and scientific research at home and abroad. In the national assessment of the first-level disciplines in China in 2012,  its "information and communication engineering" ranked second and its "electronic science and technology" ranked fourth.

Rankings 

In 2020, Academic Ranking of World Universities (ARWU) ranked Xidian University top 401–500 in the world.

Global Ranking of Academic Subjects by Academic Ranking of World Universities (ARWU) 2021

National and Global Subject Ranking of Xidian University by U.S. News & World Report 2020

School of Telecommunications Engineering 
The school is dedicated to education and research in the areas of Communications Engineering, Information Systems Security, Wireless Broadband and Signal and Information Processing. There are more than 3,800 undergraduates, 2,000 master's students and 300 doctoral students.

Departments

 Communications Engineering
 Information Engineering
  National Experimental Teaching Demonstration Center of Communication  and Information Engineering

School of Electronic Engineering 
The school has 311 faculty members, including one Member of Chinese Academy of Sciences, two National Famous Teachers of China and three National Experts with Outstanding Contribution.

Three National Key Disciplines:
Signal and Information Processing
Circuits and Systems
Electromagnetic Field and Microwave Technology

Departments

 Electronic Engineering
   Electronic and Information Engineering
   Information Countermeasures
   Intelligent Science and Technology

School of Computer Science and Technology 
The school was established in 1995. It was one of the earliest computer science school in China. The school ranks 8th in China and among top 100 in the world by Academic Ranking of World Universities.

Departments

 Computer Science and Technology
   Network Engineering
 Internet of Things Engineering
 Data Science and Big Data Technology
 Digital Media Technology

School of Mechano-electronic Engineering 

Departments

    Industrial Design
    Electrical Engineering and Automation
    Automation
    Measurement and Control Technology and Instrumentation
    Electronic Packing Technology
    Mechanical Design, Fabrication and Automation

School of Microelectronics 
The school is one of the National Instruction Bases for Integrated Circuit Talents by Ministry of Education of the People's Republic of China. Microelectronics and Solid-State Electronics is one of the National Key Disciplines.

The school has 2 undergraduate programs, 5 master's programs and 2 doctoral programs. Around 1,800 undergraduates and 850 postgraduate students are enrolled in the School.

Departments

    Microelectronics Science and Engineering
    Integrated Circuit Design and Integrated System

School of Physics and Optoelectronic Engineering 

Departments

 Laser Technology 
    Radio Wave Institute
    Applied Physics
    Optoelectronic Technology Experiment Center
    Physics Experiment Center

School of Economics and Management 

Departments

    Information Management and Information System 
    Business Administration
    Industrial Engineering
    Finance 
 Electronic Commerce

School of Mathematics and Statistics 

Departments

 Applied Mathematics
    Computing Science
    Probability and Statistics
    Operations Research and Control
    Psychology

School of Humanities and Arts 

Departments

 Politics
    Philosophy
    Chinese Language
    History
    Art

School of Foreign Languages 

Departments

 English Language& Literature
   Foreign Linguistics &Applied Linguistic
   Translation

School of Microelectronics

Departments

   Microelectronics
   Micro-circuits and Devices
   Integrated System Engineering
   Integrated Circuit Engineering

School of Life Science and Technology 

Departments

 Biomedical Engineering
    Biological Technology

School of Aerospace Science and Technology 

Departments

 Detection Guidance and Control

School of Software 

Departments

 Software Engineering (M.S. and Ph.D.)

School of Advanced Materials and Nanotechnology 

Departments

 Material Physics & Chemistry
 Material Science(M.S.)
 Applied Chemistry(M.S.)

Research 

Research at Xidian University consists of:

Telecommunication Engineering
Signal and Information Processing
Computer Science and Engineering
Microelectronics, IC design

Xidian University has four State Key Laboratories:

The State Key Laboratory of Radar Signal Processing
The State Key Laboratory of Integrated Services Network
The State Key Laboratory of Antennas and Microwave Technology
The State Key Laboratory of Wide Band Gap Semiconductor Technology

Xidian University has 5 Key Labs of Ministry of Education:

 Intelligent Perception Image Understanding
 Electronic Information Countermeasure and Simulation Technology
 Super high-speed Circuit Design and Electromagnetic Compatibility
 Electronic Equipment Structure
 Wide-Gap Semiconductor Materials Devices

Xidian has 17 Provincial Key Labs:

 Network and System Security
 Wireless Communications
 Computer Peripherals &Instruments
 general-purpose Electronic Devices Measurement
 New Semiconductor Materials Instruments
 Electric System Integration Design Techniques
 Computer Network Information Security
 Microwave Communication Techniques
 Intelligent Materials and Sensors
 Electronic Countermeasure
 Biomedical Engineering
 Wireless Physics
 Electro-mechanics
 Mathematical Modeling
 Software Systematic Engineering
 Microcircuit High Reliability Techniques
 New Laser Instrument and Optical Information Processing

Notable people

Alumni 

Shumin Zhai - Computer Scientist, ACM Fellow
Liu Chuanzhi - Founder, Lenovo
Gou Zhongwen -  director of the State General Administration of Sports
Liqing Zeng - Co-founder, Tencent
Hu Lijiao - Former Governor of the People's Bank of China
Ling Li (writer) - Writer
Zhang Rongqiao - Chief designer of Tianwen 1
Tao Li - General of People's Liberation Army
Dexian Bi - Scientist
Robert Qiu - electrical engineer and entrepreneur 
Lai Xuejia - Cryptographer
Gou Zhongwen - Politician
Hejun Yin - Vice Minister, Ministry of Science and Technology
Zhong Lin Wang - Physicist
Nianxiu Lin - Vice Chairman, National Development and Reform Commission
Feng Tian - Senior Vice President, Huawei

Faculty
Ning Cai - electrical engineer

Notes

References 

 
Universities and colleges in Xi'an
Project 211
Educational institutions established in 1931
1931 establishments in China